TTH may refer to:

 Taylor, Taylor and Hobson optical company, later Taylor-Hobson
 Team Tvis Holstebro, Danish handball team.
 Tension type headache 
 Tiger-Tree Hash, a hash tree using the Tiger hash function
 TTh, Tuesdays & Thursdays, US school scheduling abbreviation
 TTH, the National Rail station code for Thornton Heath railway station, London, England